The Keeper of the Register (more formally known as the Keeper of the National Register of Historic Places) is a National Park Service (NPS) official, responsible for deciding on the eligibility of historic properties for inclusion on the U.S. National Register of Historic Places (NRHP).

The Keeper of the Register role was created following the 1966 enactment of the National Historic Preservation Act (NHPA). The NHPA declared a national policy focus on preserving significant historic sites, and it has been amended several times since it was first enacted. The NHPA authorized the Secretary of the Interior to maintain a National Register of Historic Places, which has been delegated to the Keeper by the Director of the National Parks Service.

The first person to hold the office was William J. Murtagh, whose term ran from 1967 through 1979. The Keeper's authority may be delegated as they see fit. The State Historic Preservation Officer for each state submits nominations to the Keeper. Upon receipt, the Keeper has 45 days to decide whether to add the property to the NRHP.

The Keeper of the Register role is supported by several regional reviewers, who review submissions for inclusion on the NHRP. This team also is supported by several archaeologists, archivists, and historians.

List of Keepers 
 William J. Murtagh – 1967-1979
 Jerry L. Rogers – approximately 1981-1994
 Carol D. Shull – Acting Keeper 1979–1980, Keeper 1994–2005, Interim Keeper 2009 to January 3, 2015
 Jan Snyder Matthews – 2005–2009
 Stephanie Toothman – Keeper January 4, 2015 – June 2, 2017
 J. Paul Loether - Keeper June 3, 2017 – June 25, 2018
 Joy Beasley (NPS Associate Director, Cultural Resources Partnerships and Science) - Keeper July 2018 – current

References

National Register of Historic Places
Historic preservation
Historical preservationists